Șoldănești is a city in Moldova. It is the capital of Șoldănești District. Known as Chernenko during the communist era, the town regained its historical name in the early 1980s.

Media 
 Jurnal FM - 99.1 MHz,

References 

Cities and towns in Moldova
Orhei County (Romania)
Ținutul Nistru
Șoldănești District